XHI-FM is a radio station in Morelia, Michoacán broadcasting on 100.9 MHz.

XHI-FM broadcasts in HD.

History
XEI-AM came to air in September 1932. It was owned by Tiburcio Ponce Gutiérrez. In January 1981, it was sold to Carlos Quiñones, founder and owner of Radio S.A.

The station migrated to FM on August 7, 2011.

External links
Máxima FM

References

Radio stations in Michoacán
Radio stations established in 1943
Mass media in Morelia
Mexican radio stations with expired concessions